Amina Mama (born 19 September 1958) is a Nigerian-British writer, feminist and academic. Her main areas of focus have been post-colonial, militarist and gender issues. She has lived in Africa, Europe, and North America, and worked to build relationships between feminist intellectuals across the globe.

Background
Mama was born in northern Nigeria in 1958 in a mixed household. Her father is Nigerian and her mother is English. According to Mama, her eclectic family background and upbringing has shaped her worldview. In 1992 she married Nuruddin Farah, with whom she has two children.

She grew up in Kaduna, an ethnically and religiously diverse town in northern Nigeria. Her ancestral roots on her paternal side trace back to Bida. Several members of Mama's family were involved in the development of the post-colonial local educational system. In 1966, she left her community in Nigeria due to anti-Muslim riots.

Career
Mama moved from Nigeria to the UK and pursued further education at the University of St. Andrews, Scotland (1980, Bachelor of Science, with Honours, in Psychology), at the London School of Economics and Political Science, University of London (1981, Master of Science in Social Psychology) and at Birkbeck College, University of London, where in 1987 she received her doctorate in organizational psychology with her thesis entitled "Race and Subjectivity: A Study of Black Women". Some of her early work involves comparing the situations of British and Nigerian women. She moved to the Netherlands and then back to Nigeria, only to encounter more upheaval in 2000. Then she moved to South Africa, where she began to work at the historically white University of Cape Town (UCT). At UCT, she became the director of the African Gender Institute (AGI) and helped to found its journal Feminist Africa. Mama remains the editor of Feminist Africa.

In 2008, Mama accepted a position at Mills College in Oakland, California, United States. After moving, she commented: "I have learned America isn't just a big, bad source of imperialism." Professor Mama became Barbara Lee Distinguished Chair in Women's Leadership at Mills—the first person to hold this position. She co-taught a class called "Real Policy, Real Politics" with Congresswoman Lee on topics concerning African and African-American women, including gender roles, poverty, HIV/AIDS, and militarism. She was also Chair of the Department of Gender and Women Studies at the University of California, Davis.

Mama is the Chair of the board of directors for the Global Fund for Women, and advises several other international organisations. She has sat on the board of directors of the United Nations Research Institute for Social Development.

Mama serves on the advisory board for the feminist academic journals Meridians and Signs.

In 2012, Mama also took part in co-principal investigations with Margo Okazawa-Rey, Rose Mensah-Kutin, and other women over the militarized and post-conflict areas of Sierra Leone, Liberia, Ghana, and Nigeria, where they explored the role of feminist research in activism, policy change, and women's empowerment.

One of her best known works is Beyond the Masks: Race, Gender and Subjectivity. She is also involved in film work. In 2010, she co-produced the movie The Witches of Gambaga with Yaba Badoe.

Thought
Mama describes herself as a feminist and not a womanist, arguing that feminism originates in Africa and that white feminism "has never been strong enough to be 'enemy'—in the way that say, global capitalism can be viewed as an enemy". She has criticised discourses of women in development for stripping gender studies of politically meaningful feminism. She has also argued that African universities continue to show entrenched patriarchy, in terms of both interpersonal sexism and institutional gender gaps.

A primary area of interest for Mama has been gender identity as it relates to global militarism. She is an outspoken critic of AFRICOM, which she describes as part of violent neocolonial resource extraction.

Publications
 The Hidden Struggle: Statutory and Voluntary Sector Responses to Violence Against Black Women in the Home. Runnymede, 1989; republished by Whiting and Birch, 1996. 
 Black Women and the Police: A Place Where the Law is Not Upheld, in Inside Babylon: The Caribbean Diaspora in Britain, ed. Winston James and Clive Harris. London: Verso, 1993. .
 Beyond the Masks: Race, Gender, and Subjectivity. New York: Routledge, 1995. .
 National Machinery for Women in Africa: Towards an analysis. Third World Network, 2000. .
 "Is It Ethical to Study Africa? Preliminary Thoughts on Scholarship and Freedom". African Studies Review 50 (1), April 2007.

References

External links
Global Fund for Women Info
Brief bio at Smith College site
Bio at African Gender Institute
 Feminists Respond to AFRICOM: An interview with Amina Mama  —audio interview about AFRICOM and militarism conducted by Preeti Shekar, 11 October 2010

Nigerian writers
Feminist studies scholars
Academic staff of the University of Cape Town
1958 births
Living people
British emigrants to the United States
Mills College faculty
University of California, Davis faculty
Alumni of Birkbeck, University of London
Alumni of the University of St Andrews
Alumni of the London School of Economics
Nigerian women writers
People from Kaduna
Nigerian emigrants to the United Kingdom
Nigerian people of British descent
20th-century British women writers
21st-century British women writers
Nigerian expatriates in South Africa
Nigerian expatriates in the Netherlands
Nigerian expatriate academics in the United States
20th-century Nigerian writers
21st-century Nigerian writers